The 1984 Midwestern City Conference men's basketball tournament (now known as the Horizon League men's basketball tournament) was held March 8–10 at UIC Pavilion in Chicago, Illinois.

 defeated  in the championship game, 68–66, to win their first MCC/Horizon League men's basketball tournament.

The Golden Eagles received an automatic bid to the 1984 NCAA tournament as the #11 seed in the Midwest region.

Format
All eight conference members participated in the tournament and were seeded based on regular season conference records.

Bracket

References

Horizon League men's basketball tournament
Tournament
Midwestern City Conference men's basketball tournament
Midwestern City Conference men's basketball tournament